Janet Kerdikoshvili (born 29 November 1991) is a Georgian model, singer, and beauty pageant titleholder. She was crowned Miss Georgia 2011 and competed at the Miss World 2011 pageant, and was later designated to represent Georgia at Miss Universe 2013, before withdrawing due to unexpected health problems. In 2015, the Miss Georgia Organization appointed her to compete at the Miss Universe 2015 pageant.

In 2013, Kerdikoshvili competed in the Russian reality singing competition Khochu v VIA Gru, which attempted to cast a revamped version of the Ukrainian girl group Nu Virgos.

Personal life
As of 2013, she was a graduate with a journalism degree.

She studied Fashion Design at Istituto Marangoni in Milan for one year from 2016 to 2017.

In September 2017 Kerdikoshvili moved to Moscow, Russia.

Kerdikoshvilli moved to Georgia, Tbilisi in 2019.

Miss World 2011, the 61st edition of the Miss World pageant, was held on 6 November 2011 at the Earls Court Two in London, United Kingdom. As part of the events, the contestants also travelled to Edinburgh, Scotland between 23 and 27 October. Alexandria Mills of the United States crowned her successor Ivian Sarcos of Venezuela at the end of the event, she is the sixth Venezuelan women to win Miss World. Although over 120 delegates were expected to compete, problems regarding the timely acquisition of visas prevented several candidates from participating, thus reducing the final number to 113. Miss World 2011 was viewed by over 1 billion people worldwide.

Designations
Kerdikoshvili was appointed as Miss Universe Georgia 2013 after a casting call took place. Kerdikoshvili was to represent her country at the 2013 Miss Universe pageant at Crocus City Hall in Krasnogorsk, Moscow Oblast, Russia on 9 November 2013 before withdrawing due to an unexpected illness.

Miss Georgia Universe 2015
On 16 October 2015 Kerdikoshvili was appointed to compete at the Miss Universe 2015 pageant, which took place on 20 December 2015. She was unplaced in the semi-finals.

References

External links

 Official Miss Georgia website

1991 births
Living people
Miss Universe 2015 contestants
Miss World 2011 delegates
Beauty pageant winners from Georgia (country)
Models from Tbilisi
Female models from Georgia (country)
Miss Georgia (country) winners